Royal Air Force Honeybourne or RAF Honeybourne was a Royal Air Force station located  south of Honeybourne, Worcestershire, England and  east of Evesham, Worcestershire, England

The station was operational from 1940 or 1941 to 1946 or 15 November 1947.

Station history

RAF Honeybourne had five hangars there was one J Type and 4 T2's. The airfield used a mixture of temporary and permanent accommodation and on 1 December 1944 there were 1973 males and 382 females located at the airfield.

No. 24 Operational Training Unit RAF was formed on 15 March 1942 at Honeybourne as part of No. 7 Group RAF Bomber Command to train night bomber crews using the Armstrong Whitworth Whitley. It carried out three operational sorties during 1942. Converted to the Vickers Wellington in April 1944 to train Royal Canadian Air Force crews, disbanded in July 1945. It is also reported that the OTU may have flown leaflet dropping sorties.

A number of units based from RAF Ferry Command were based including the Ferry Training Unit RAF using Lockheed Hudsons and Bristol Beauforts were based at the airfield between November 1941 and March 1942, and No. 1425 (Communication) Flight RAF using Consolidated Liberators between November 1941 and April 1942.

The airfield was protected by No. 2828 Squadron RAF Regiment

Postwar

The airfield was also temporarily home to No. 21 Operational Training Unit flying Wellingtons from RAF Enstone from August 1945 for two months because the runways at their home base were being repaired. From October 1945 until 1946 107 Sub Storage Unit from No. 8 Maintenance Unit used the airfield for storing Wellingtons and General Aircraft Hamilcar gliders.

The role of the airfield after the war changed with the reduction of flying movements and with a slight change in what the units did on the airfield when No. 107 Sub Storage Unit from 1947 began to collect no longer needed Wellingtons which were then scrapped and taken to Weston Subedge goods yard (which was near to the south-western corner) where the railway would take them to the necessary destination.

Accidents and incidents

7 August 1940 Handley Page Hampden P2086 of 4 Ferry Pilots Pool stalled attempting to force land after an engine failure.

24 December 1941 Bristol Blenheim L8663 of Ferry Training Unit stalled on approach.

10 March 1942 Lockheed Hudson V8995 of the Ferry Training Unit spun into ground.

20 July 1943 Avro Anson DJ242 of 24 OTU undershot landing.

14 May 1944 Armstrong Whitworth Whitley N1436 of 24 OTU stalled on overshoot.

6 January 1945 Vickers Wellington HE633 of 24 OTU crashed on takeoff when an engine failed.

28 April 1947 Wellington JA349 was hit by Wellington LR130 while parked.

Current use

In July 1948 the site was closed and much has reverted to farmland with runways being removed in 1968.

During 1949 and into 1950 parts of the site were used for temporary housing for local families while new Council housing developments were being built in the area - people moving into the new houses when completed.

Since then, the airside area has evolved into the Honeybourne Airfield Trading Estate.

References

External links
 BBC History- Life in the Womens Auxiliary Air Force
 Map which clearly shows the airport outline

Royal Air Force stations in Worcestershire
Royal Air Force stations of World War II in the United Kingdom
Wychavon
Military units and formations established in 1941
1941 establishments in England